Héctor Zamora (born 1974 in Mexico City) is a Mexican visual artist living and working in São Paulo, Brazil. In 2020 he was awarded the roof commission at the Metropolitan Museum of Art in New York City for which he created Lattice Detour. Writing in the New York Times art critic Holland Cotter said of the work ..."it’s a monument to openness over enclosure, lightness over heaviness, transience over permanence. It’s also an image fraught with political meaning about what a wall — and specifically the planned U.S.-Mexico border wall hailed as “beautiful” by our current president — should be and do"......

For the 2021 Bruges Triennial he has executed a giant red scaffolding structure around an Austrian Pine tree in the centre of the walled garden of Gezellehuis.

References

Mexican artists
Living people
1974 births